The Little Swan Island, part of the Waterhouse Island Group, is a  uninhabited granite island situated in Banks Strait, part of Bass Strait, lying close to the north-eastern coast of Tasmania, Australia.

Other islands in the Waterhouse Group include the Ninth, Tenth, Waterhouse, Little Waterhouse, Maclean, Baynes, Cygnet, Foster, Swan, Bird Rock, George Rocks, St Helens, and Paddys islands.

Fauna
Recorded breeding seabird and wader species are little penguin, short-tailed shearwater, common diving-petrel, white-faced storm-petrel, Pacific gull, sooty oystercatcher and Australian pelican.  The pelican colony is the southernmost in Australia.  The metallic skink is present.

See also

List of islands of Tasmania

References

Islands of North East Tasmania
Waterhouse Island group